These are the Hong Kong Island results of the 2004 Hong Kong legislative election. The election was held on 12 September 2004 and all 6 seats in Hong Kong Island were contested. The pro-democracy camp failed to win four out of six seats with the two tickets of the Democratic Party and Article 45 Concern Group's Audrey Eu and The Frontier's Cyd Ho joint ticket. The last-minute emergency call of Martin Lee cost the defeat of Cyd Ho in a narrow margin to Democratic Alliance for the Betterment of Hong Kong's (DAB) Choy So-yuk. Legislative Council President Rita Fan also contested in Hong Kong Island for the first time.

Six tickets took part in the election, with the DAB fielding a ticket of chairman Ma Lik and Choy So-yuk and the pro-democrats fielding two tickets, one consisted of Martin Lee, Yeung Sum and Joseph Lai of the Democratic Party and the other consisted of Audrey Eu and Cyd Ho. Other candidates included former Democratic Party member Tsang Kin-shing and independent insurance agent Kelvin Wong Kam-fai. Rita Fan also fielded her one-candidate ticket, aiming at the votes from the middle and upper class voters from the sandwich of Hong Kong's pro-Beijing vs. pro-democracy political spectrum, despite herself was supported by the pro-Beijing camp.

The two pro-democracy tickets with the slogan "1+1=4" provided that their supporters would have cast their votes evenly to the two tickets. Pre-election polls showed, nevertheless, that the Eu-Ho ticket had far more supporters, causing the Democratic Party to request all supporters of the camp to vote instead for their ticket just two weeks before the election. It turned out that the Democratic Party drew too many votes from the Eu-Ho ticket, causing Cyd Ho defeat by DAB's Choy So-yuk, by a slim margin of 815 votes (or 0.23% of all valid votes). Should the Democratic Party drew around 1900 more votes from the Eu-Ho ticket, the third-rank candidate on their list would have defeated Choy. When the results were announced in the morning of the following day, Martin Lee said before cameras "I'd rather lose with dignity than win like this", on the "unexpected" defeat of Cyd Ho.

Overall results
Before election:

Change in composition:

Candidates list

See also
Legislative Council of Hong Kong
Hong Kong legislative elections
2004 Hong Kong legislative election

References

2004 Hong Kong legislative election